Soul on Top is the 28th studio album by American musician James Brown. The album was released in April 1970, by King. Brown and saxophonist Maceo Parker worked with arranger/conductor Oliver Nelson to record a big band, funk and jazz vocal album. It was recorded with Louie Bellson and his 18-piece jazz orchestra at United Western Recorders in Hollywood, California in November 1969, and features jazz standards, show tunes, and middle of the road hits, as well as a new arrangement of Brown's funk hit "Papa's Got a Brand New Bag".

The album was reissued in 2004 with one previously unreleased bonus track, a big band version of Brown's 1967 hit "There Was a Time", and new liner notes by jazz critic Will Friedwald.

Critical reception 

Reviewing the Verve reissue for The Village Voice in September 2004, Tom Hull said, "This extends Ray Charles's omnivorous big-band soul, with Brown reinventing standards—'That's My Desire,' 'September Song,' 'Every Day I Have the Blues,' 'Papa's Got a Brand New Bag'—in front of Louie Bellson's orchestra, which arranger-conductor Oliver Nelson barely manages to discipline, so caught up is the band in the singer's excitement. In Brown's discography, just a curio. But in the whole history of big band jazz, there's never been a singer like him."

Track listing

Personnel
James Brown - vocal
Oliver Nelson - arranger and conductor
Ernie Watts - alto saxophone
Joe Romano - alto saxophone
Maceo Parker - tenor saxophone
Buddy Collette - tenor saxophone
Pete Christlieb - tenor saxophone
Jim Mulidore - baritone saxophone
Al Aarons - trumpet
Chuck Findley - trumpet
John Audino - trumpet
Tom Porello - trumpet
Jimmy Cleveland - trombone
Nick DiMaio - trombone
Kenny Shroyer - trombone
Bill Tole - trombone
Frank Vincent - piano
Bill Pitman - guitar
Louis Shelton - guitar
Ray Brown - bass
Louis Bellson - drums, bandleader
Jack Arnold - percussion

Notes
 Terrel, Tom (October 5, 2004). "James Brown's 'Soul on Top' Reissued". National Public Radio. Retrieved on April 27, 2007.

References

Further reading
 Christian McBride (2015). "Mr. Soul on  Top".  Retrieved July 05, 2022. Christian McBride's recollections about convincing James Brown to join him for a 2006 revival performance of "Soul On Top" at the Hollywood Bowl.

James Brown albums
1970 albums
King Records (United States) albums
Verve Records albums
Albums conducted by Oliver Nelson
Albums arranged by Oliver Nelson
Albums produced by James Brown